Taipei Medical University (TMU) in Taiwan is located in Taipei's Xinyi District. Founded as Taipei Medical College in 1960, it was renamed as Taipei Medical University in 2000. TMU has expanded into a world class university with ten colleges, 6,000 students per year, five hospitals (TMU hospital, Wan Fang Medical Center, Shuang-Ho Hospital, Taipei Cancer Center, TMU NingBo medical Center), and more than 40,000 alumni around the world.

In July 2017, Global Views Monthly Magazine released the ranking for Taiwan’s Best Universities, in which TMU was ranked 9th. In particular, TMU was ranked top 1 in both the faculty-student ratio section (1:9.9) and the average annual budget per student section. In February 2017, Cheers Magazine published the list of the Top 20 Universities of Excellence Performance. TMU was at the 10th place in overall national ranking. Moreover, according to the Times Higher Education (THE) Asia University Ranking 2017, TMU was ranked as 91st place.

History
Dr. Shui-Wang Hu and Dr. Chien-Tien Hsu founded Taipei Medical College on June 1, 1960. The college started as three buildings. Dr. Shui-Wang Hu and Dr. Chien-Tien Hsu, together with other medical professionals and educators, ran the school, using their own personal books as textbooks. With the help of private donations, the school flourished.

In 2000 the school was renamed Taipei Medical University.

Academics
TMU is composed of eleven colleges and one center: 
 College of Medicine
 College of Oral Medicine
 College of Pharmacy
 College of Nursing
 College of Public Health
 College of Medical Science and Technology
 College of Humanity and Social Science
 Biomedical Engineering
 College of Management
 College of Nutrition
 College of Interdisciplinary Studies
 Center of General Education

There are three affiliated hospitals throughout southern Taipei.

The university also has 12 undergraduate schools and 14 graduate institutes.

Research
TMU research focuses on traumatic brain injury, regenerative medicine, cancer, reproductive medicine, biomedical materials, and dental research. The annual funding TMU receives for research exceeds NT$600 million. In 2009, a Ministry of Education incentive program promoting university-industry cooperation selected the university to receive more than NT$50 million in grants over three years.

Campus
Taipei Medical University is located on Wuxing Street, a few blocks away from one of the tallest buildings in the world, Taipei 101. The campus is made up of 10 school buildings, each equipped with instructional rooms as well as research facilities. Adjacent to the campus is the Taipei Medical University Hospital, one of the university's three affiliated hospitals. The TMU website provides an online campus map.

Transportation
The hospital runs a free shuttle bus to and from the Taipei City Hall MRT stop every 15 minutes. There is also a shuttle bus to and from the Liuzhangli MRT station, running every half hour. Other public transport to TMU are the public buses that stop near the university.

Green University
The university turned to international environmental diplomacy scholars, the former Director of Environmental Protection, Professor Chen Zhongxin, now the Chair Professor of International Health at Taipei Medical University. He and ten other environmental health professors  help the university participate in carbon reduction as well as sustainable management. Taipei Medical University received the Taipei City "Green Procurement" and the Ministry of the Interior's "Green Building Award".

Attractions
Located within a ten-minute bus ride from the university are some of Taipei's cultural centers. Taipei City Hall and Taipei 101 are down the street from the MRT station. A little further and there is Taipei World Trade Center. Sun Yat-sen Memorial Hall is also located near Taipei 101. Close by are shopping centers as well as a Warner Village Cinema and an ESLite.

Student life

Residential life
There is one dormitory on campus and three international dormitories off campus, all within walking distance or reachable by bus. The Liuzhangli dormitories feature furnished, 2-bed rooms. The Wuxing Street dorms are available on four floors. All rooms are furnished. It is located near a traditional market and convenience store. The last dorm, located on Fuyang Street, is on the fourth and fifth floor of an apartment building, located near the Liuzhangli MRT station.

Dining
The university offers a food court in the basement of the United Medical Building. In the center of campus is a 7-Eleven as well as a French-Italian restaurant called Mr. J. The hospital contains a cafeteria that makes MSG-free food. In the streets near the campus are small restaurants, shops, and vendors for a quick meal or a sit-down meal.

Library
The library, located in the United Medical Building's second to fourth floor, contains 150,000 volumes as well as DVDs and movies. Printed and electronic books are available in Chinese, English, Japanese, and other languages. There are spaces for students to study or to hang out with friends.

Clubs and facilities
TMU contains a computer lab, meeting rooms, and offices for its 80 student clubs.

Sports facilities include an indoor pool, aerobics room, gym, baseball field, basketball court, and tennis courts.

International missions
Taipei Medical University is involved in the International Cooperation and Development Fund. It helps organize and manage the medical mission to São Tomé and Príncipe, a Western Africa island. The project develops diplomatic relationships for the government of Taiwan. TMU sends medical personnel to the area, and provides medical services to its citizens, screens for parasites, and investigates water quality.

Affiliated hospitals
TMU has three affiliated hospitals, all located within Taipei.

Taipei Medical University Hospital, established in 1976, is the oldest of TMU's three affiliated hospitals. It is located next to the university and is composed of three buildings. The hospital researches In vitro fertilisation (IVF) as well as minimally invasive surgery.

Wan Fang Medical Center is the first privately owned and publicly run hospital in Taipei. It is located in the Wenshan District of Taipei, near its own MRT station. Some of its departments are the Cyberknife, reproductive medicine center, stem cell research, and joint replacement center.

Shuang-Ho Hospital is the newest of the three, opened in 2008. It is the largest hospital in New Taipei City. The hospital has a helicopter landing pad, allowing for 24-hour air emergency medical services to patients throughout Taiwan and to Taiwan's offshore islands. The hospital has the only Disabled Patient Oral Health Care Center in Taipei.

Awards and accreditations
Taipei Medical University has earned the National Quality Award and has been accredited by the World Health Organization as an International Safe School. The school is listed as one of the top 100 medical universities in QS Asia University Rankings 2011. All three of its affiliated hospitals have earned Joint Commission International status.
 Organization Award, 20th Taiwan's National Quality Award (2010)
 Accredited as an International Safe School (ISS) by the World Health Organization
 Certified by the British Standards Institution for global development in sustainability at the international level (GRI G3) and AA 1000 AS certification
 Accredited by Joint Commission International (JCI) for three affiliated hospitals: TMU Hospital, TMU-Wan Fang Hospital and TMU-Shuang Ho Hospital
 Accredited by ISO 9001:2008 (Quality Management), ISO 14001:2004 (Environmental Management), OHSAS 18001:2007 (Vocational Safety & Hygiene), ISO 27001:2005 (International Information Safety), ISO 14064:2006 (Green House Gas, GHG)

Sister schools
Taipei Medical University has 105 international sister schools.

Africa

 ：University of Gambia
 ：Great Lakes University of Kisumu

 ：University of Swaziland
 ：Nazarene College of Nursing

North America

 ：University of Missouri-Kansas City
 ：Loma Linda University
 ：University of California, San Francisco
 ：University of Washington
 ：University of Texas Health Science Center, Houston
 ：University of California, Los Angeles
 ：Ohio State University, College of Pharmacy
 ：University of California, Irvine
 ：California State University, Fullerton
 ：AHMC Healthcare
 ：American College of Acupuncture & Oriental Medicine
 ：Tufts University
 ：Palm Beach Atlantic University
 ：Southern New Hampshire University

 ：Tulane University
 ：University of Pennsylvania
 ：University of Mississippi Medical Center
 ：Louisiana College
 ：Jamestown College
 ：Ohio State University
 ：University of Pittsburgh
 ：Virginia Commonwealth University
 ：Southern California University of Health Sciences
 ：University of Southern California
 ：University of California, San Diego
 ：University of Kansas Medical Center
 ：Florida International University
 ：Park University

Latin America

 ：University of Health Sciences Antigua

 ：Universidad Francisco Marroquin

Asia

 ：Nihon University
 ：Tokyo Medical and Dental University
 ：Health Sciences University of Hokkaido
 ：Hiroshima University
 ：Tohoku Fukushi University
 ：University of Tohoku
 ：University of Occupational and Environmental Health
 ：Tokyo Dental University
 ：Showa University
 ：Juntendo University
 ：Japanese Red Cross Akita College of Nursing
 ：University of Tokyo
 ：Osaka Dental University
 ：Osaka City University
 ：National Cancer Center Research Institute
 ：Teikyo University
 ：Yokohama International School
 ：Tokushima Bunri University
 ：Okinawa Prefectural Care University
 ：University of Hong Kong
 ：The Chinese University of Hong Kong
 ：Tsinghua University
 ：Beijing University Health Science Center

 ：Peking Union Medical College
 ：Fujian Medical University
 ：Anhui Medical University
 ：Shanghai Jiaotong University
 ：Hangzhou Normal University
 ：Zibo Vocational Institute
 ：Zhejiang University
 ：National University of Singapore
 ：University of Malaya
 ：Konkuk University
 ：Seoul National University
 ：International Cyber University
 ：Central University
 ：India's National Institute of Mental and Nervous Medical Center
 ：Gadjah Mada University
 ：Pelita Harapan University
 ：Kazakhstan School of Public Health
 ：International University of Central Asia
 ：Health Sciences University of Mongolia
 ：National University of Mongolia
 ：Mongolian University of Science and Technology
 ：Mahidol University
 ：Mustafa Kemal University - Antakya

Europe

 ：New University of Leuven
 ：Palacky University of Olomouc
 ：Charles University
 ：School for Advanced Studies in Public Health
 ：Hamburg College of Music and Drama
 ：Charité, Medical University Berlin
 ：Dresden University of Technology
 ：University of Western Macedonia
 ：University of Debrecen
 ：Semmelweis University
 ：Craig University

 ：University of Florence
 ：University of Bologna
 ：Lublin Medical University
 ：Bogdan Voda University
 ：Alec University
 ：Kallu Ji Bapu University
 ：Lucian Braga University
 ：Polytechnic University of Valencia
 ：Birmingham City University
 ：Imperial College London
 ：University of Dundee

Oceania

 ：University of Melbourne
 ：Griffith University

 ：University of Wollongong

Notable alumni
 Chen Shih-chung, Minister of Health and Welfare
 Hsueh Jui-yuan, Vice Minister of Health and Welfare
 Lin Tzou-yien, Minister of Health and Welfare (2016-2017)
 Winston Dang, Minister of Environmental Protection Administration (2007-2008)
 Yang Sui-sheng, Magistrate of Lienchiang County (2009-2014)
 Jen-Tien Wung, anesthesiologist/neonatologist, professor at Columbia University, and developer of Bubble CPAP

See also
 List of universities in Taiwan
 Taipei Medical University Hospital
 U12 Consortium

References

External links

 Official website
 Office of Global Engagement
 Taipei Medical University Hospital
 TMU-Wan Fang Hospital
 TMU-Shuang Ho Hospital
 TMU Lihuili Hospital (Ningbo, China)

 
1960 establishments in Taiwan
Educational institutions established in 1960
Nursing schools in Taiwan
Scientific organizations based in Taiwan
Universities and colleges in Taiwan
Universities and colleges in Taipei
Technical universities and colleges in Taiwan
Private universities and colleges in Taiwan